William Caddick (4 March 1898–1981) was an English footballer who played in the Football League for Wolverhampton Wanderers.

References

1898 births
1981 deaths
English footballers
Association football midfielders
English Football League players
Telford United F.C. players
Wolverhampton Wanderers F.C. players